The Interchurch World Movement was an attempt to unite some of the main enterprises of the Protestant churches, so as to avoid duplication of effort and waste of funds.

The result of the conference was the launching of the Interchurch World Movement with the object not of any organic union of the denominations but the attempt to see how much could be done effectively in common.

A general committee from all the churches was selected of which S. Earl Taylor became the general secretary. As head of the Methodist Centenary Fund he had shown great executive capacity and organizing ability. The committee set itself to work to first make a survey of world conditions and it has not completed this phase of the work.

References
 

1918 establishments in the United States
1920 disestablishments in the United States
Religious organizations